Lirim M. Kastrati (born 16 January 1999) is a Kosovan professional footballer who plays as a winger for Nemzeti Bajnokság I club Fehérvár and the Kosovo national team.

Club career

Lokomotiva
On 17 February 2018, Kastrati made his debut as a professional footballer in a 1–0 away defeat against Istra 1961 after being named in the starting line-up. On 10 March 2018, he scored his first two goals in a 4–1 away win over Dinamo Zagreb. On 16 September 2018, Kastrati scored the first hat-trick of his career in a 5–2 away win over Slaven Belupo. On 17 February 2020, Kastrati signed a five-year contract with Dinamo Zagreb. He was sent back on loan to Lokomotiva for the remainder of the season. Four days later, he played the first game after the return against Varaždin after being named in the starting line-up.

Dinamo Zagreb
On 5 August 2020, Kastrati returned to Dinamo Zagreb. His debut with Dinamo Zagreb came eleven days later in a 6–0 home win against his former club Lokomotiva after being named in the starting line-up. Five days after debut, Kastrati was sent off in a 0–1 away win against Istra 1961 after a rough tackle on Obeng Regan. On 26 August, he scored his first goal for Dinamo Zagreb in his third appearance for the club in a 2–2 away draw over CFR Cluj in Champions League qualifying, which Dinamo Zagreb won 6–5 after penalty shootout and progressed to the third qualifying round.

On 12 September, Kastrati scored his first league goal in the Eternal derby as Dinamo Zagreb defeated Hajduk Split 2–1 at Stadion Poljud. On 22 October, he made his debut in a UEFA competition in the Europa League against Feyenoord after being named in the starting line-up. On 10 December, he scored his first European goal for Dinamo Zagreb in a 3–1 home win over CSKA Moscow.

During the second half of the season, Kastrati's inefficiency forced coach Zoran Mamić and his successor Damir Krznar to drop him from the starting XI. On 25 April 2021, Krznar unexpectedly named Kastrati in the starting XI for another Eternal derby, this time at Stadion Maksimir, which ended as a 2–0 victory with Kastrati scoring the second goal. After the game, Kastrati and Hajduk's coach Paolo Tramezzani were a subject of controversy after Kastrati was seen giving Tramezzani his shirt.

Legia Warsaw
On 1 September 2021, Kastrati joined Ekstraklasa side Legia Warsaw. In same day later, the club confirmed that he had joined on a four-year contract and received squad number 7. His debut with Legia Warsaw came ten days later in a 1–0 away defeat against Śląsk Wrocław after coming on as a substitute at 46th minute in place of Kacper Skibicki. On 15 September 2021, he scored his first goal for Legia Warsaw in his second appearance for the club in a 1–0 away win over Spartak Moscow in UEFA Europa League.

Fehérvár
On 29 August 2022, Kastrati signed a three-year contract with Nemzeti Bajnokság I club Fehérvár and received squad number 10. His debut with Fehérvár came two days later in a 2–1 home win against Kecskemét after coming on as a substitute at 66th minute in place of Funsho Bamgboye.

International career

Under-19
On 1 October 2017, Kastrati was named as part of the Kosovo U19 squad for 2018 UEFA European Under-19 Championship qualifications. On 3 October 2017, he made his debut with Kosovo U19 in a match against Austria U19 after being named in the starting line-up.

Under-21
On 6 November 2017, Kastrati received a call-up from Kosovo U21 for 2019 UEFA European Under-21 Championship qualification matches against Israel U21 and Azerbaijan U21. On 14 November 2017, he made his debut with Kosovo U21 in a match against Azerbaijan U21 after coming on as a substitute at 46th minute in place of Mirlind Daku.

Senior
On 5 October 2018, Kastrati received a call-up from Kosovo for the 2018–19 UEFA Nations League matches against Malta and Faroe Islands. On 11 October 2018, he made his debut with Kosovo in a match against Malta after coming on as a substitute at 83rd minute in place of Vedat Muriqi. He scored his debut goal and the only goal in the 2020–21 UEFA Nations League victory over Moldova on 18 November 2020, saving Kosovo from relegation to League D.

Personal life
Kastrati was born in Kosovska Kamenica, FR Yugoslavia (present-day Kamenica, Kosovo) to Kosovo Albanian parents from the village of Hogosht near Kamenica. He is in a relationship with Croatian model Anđela Šimac, with whom he has a daughter Indiah.

Career statistics

Club

International

International goals
Scores and results list Kosovo's goal tally first.

|-
|align="center"|1 
|18 November 2020
| rowspan=2| Fadil Vokrri Stadium, Pristina, Kosovo
|
|align="center"|1–0
|align="center"|1–0
|2020–21 UEFA Nations League C3
|align="center"|
|-
| align="center"|2 || 16 November 2022 ||  || align=center|2–2 || align=center| 2–2 || Friendly
|-
|}

Honours
Dinamo Zagreb
Prva HNL: 2020–21
Croatian Cup: 2020–21

References

External links

Lirim Kastrati at the Albanian Football Association

1999 births
Living people
People from Kamenica, Kosovo
Kosovan footballers
Kosovo youth international footballers
Kosovo under-21 international footballers
Kosovo international footballers
Kosovan expatriate footballers
Expatriate footballers in Croatia
Kosovan expatriate sportspeople in Croatia
Expatriate footballers in Poland
Kosovan expatriate sportspeople in Poland
Expatriate footballers in Hungary
Kosovan expatriate sportspeople in Hungary
Association football wingers
Croatian Football League players
Ekstraklasa players
Nemzeti Bajnokság I players
NK Lokomotiva Zagreb players
GNK Dinamo Zagreb players
Legia Warsaw players
Fehérvár FC players